The 1945 Kilkenny Senior Hurling Championship was the 51st staging of the Kilkenny Senior Hurling Championship since its establishment by the Kilkenny County Board.

On 21 October 1945, Éire Óg won the championship after a 4-08 to 1-07 defeat of Carrickshock in a final replay. It was their third championship title overall and their second title in succession.

Results

Final

References

Kilkenny Senior Hurling Championship
Kilkenny Senior Hurling Championship